Hungary competed at the 2012 Summer Olympics in London, from 27 July to 12 August 2012. Hungarian athletes have competed at every Summer Olympic Games in the modern era, except the 1920 Summer Olympics in Antwerp, and the 1984 Summer Olympics in Los Angeles because of the Soviet boycott. The Hungarian Olympic Committee (MOB) sent the nation's smallest delegation to the Games since 1956. A total of 159 athletes, 97 men and 62 women, competed in 18 sports.

Hungary originally left London with a total of 17 medals (8 gold, 4 silver, and 5 bronze), finishing tenth in the overall medal standings. Almost a third of the medals were awarded to the team in sprint canoeing, three in swimming, and two each in judo and wrestling. Three Hungarian athletes, all from sprint canoeing, won more than a single Olympic medal in London. For the first time since 1996, Hungary did not win an Olympic medal in men's water polo.

Among the nation's medalists were gymnast Krisztián Berki, who became the fourth Hungarian to claim the title in men's pommel horse after 24 years, and hammer thrower Krisztián Pars, who narrowly missed out on the medal standings in Beijing. Katalin Kovács, who won gold and silver in London, emerged as the greatest Hungarian sprint kayaker in history, with a total of eight Olympic medals. Multiple-time European champion László Cseh, who won bronze in London, became one of the most successful Hungarian swimmers in history, with a total of five Olympic medals. Meanwhile, former Olympic silver medalist Dániel Gyurta, set a world record to win the gold in men's breaststroke swimming. Éva Risztov, who retired from the pool after competing in two of her events, became an Olympic champion in women's open water marathon.

On 7 November 2012, the International Olympic Committee stripped Uzbek wrestler Soslan Tigiev of his bronze medal after testing positive for the prohibited substance methylhexaneamine. Gábor Hatos, who lost to Tigiev in the final repechage bout, was subsequently awarded the bronze medal.

Medalists

| width=78% align=left valign=top |

| width=22% align=left valign=top |

Delegation 
Magyar Olimpiai Bizottság (MOB) selected a team of 159 athletes, 97 men and 62 women, to compete in 18 sports; it was the nation's smallest delegation sent to the Olympics since 1956. Water polo and men's handball were the only team-based sports in which Hungary had its representation in these Olympic games. There was only a single competitor in road cycling, triathlon, and weightlifting. Swimming was the largest team by sport, with a total of 31 competitors.

The Hungarian team featured past Olympic champions, three of them defending (sprint kayakers Katalin Kovács and Nataša Dušev-Janić, and the men's national water polo team). Dusev-Janics, who won a total of three gold medals for Hungary, previously competed as part of the former Federal Republic of Yugoslavia in 2000. Six Hungarian athletes made their fifth Olympic appearance: sprint canoer and multiple-time Olympic champion Zoltán Kammerer, water polo player Tamás Kásás, table tennis player Krisztina Tóth, fencers Géza Imre and Aida Mohamed, and windsurfer Áron Gádorfalvi. Double trap shooter Richárd Bognár, at age 45, was the oldest athlete of the team, while butterfly swimmer Liliána Szilágyi was the youngest at age 15. Péter Biros, who led his water polo team by winning the gold medal in three consecutive Olympic Games, was the nation's flag bearer at the opening ceremony.

Other notable Hungarian athletes featured swimmer and triple Olympic silver medalist László Cseh, pommel horse gymnast and two-time defending world champion Krisztián Berki, hammer thrower and multiple-time World Challenge champion Krisztián Pars, and sabre fencer Áron Szilágyi.

The following is the list of number of competitors participating in the Games:

| width=75% align=left valign=top |

| width=25% align=left valign=top |

Athletics

Hungarian athletes have so far achieved qualifying standards in the following athletics events (up to a maximum of 3 athletes in each event at the 'A' Standard, and 1 at the 'B' Standard):

Men
Track & road events

Field events

Combined events – Decathlon

Women
Track & road events

Field events

Combined events – Heptathlon

Boxing

Hungary has so far qualified boxers for the following events

Men

Canoeing

Sprint
Hungary has qualified boats for the following events

Men

Women

Legend: FA = Qualify to final (medal); FB = Qualify to final B (non-medal); OB = Olympic Best

Cycling

Road

Mountain biking

Diving

Women

Fencing

Hungary has qualified 4 fencers.
Men

Women

Gymnastics

Artistic
Hungary has qualified three athletes.
Men

Women

Handball

Men's tournament

Group play

Quarterfinals

Semifinals

Bronze medal game

Judo

Men

Women

Modern pentathlon

Hungary has qualified two men and two women.

* Did not finish

Rowing

Hungary has qualified the following boats.

Men

Qualification Legend: FA=Final A (medal); FB=Final B (non-medal); FC=Final C (non-medal); FD=Final D (non-medal); FE=Final E (non-medal); FF=Final F (non-medal); SA/B=Semifinals A/B; SC/D=Semifinals C/D; SE/F=Semifinals E/F; QF=Quarterfinals; R=Repechage

Sailing

Hungary has qualified 1 boat for each of the following events

Men

Women

Legend: M=Medal race; DNF=Did not finish; EL= Eliminated – did not advance into the medal race;

Shooting

Men

Women

Swimming

Swimmers have so far achieved qualifying standards in the following events (up to a maximum of 2 swimmers in each event at the Olympic Qualifying Time (OQT), and potentially 1 at the Olympic Selection Time (OST)):

Men

Women

Gábor Financsek was designated to compete in 4 × 100 m medley relay, Orsolya Tompa and Brigitta Gregus were designated to compete in 4 × 100 m medley relay, Sára Joó and Vivien Kádas were designated to compete in 4 × 200 m freestyle relay, but they did not participate. They are official members of the Hungarian Olympic Team, but they did not compete in any event.

Synchronized swimming

Hungary has qualified 2 quota places in synchronized swimming.

Table tennis

Two Hungarian table tennis players have qualified for the Games. Based on their world ranking on 16 May 2011 Krisztina Tóth and Georgina Póta qualified for the women's singles.

Tennis

Triathlon

Hungary has qualified the following athletes.

Water polo

Hungary has qualified a men's and a women's team.  The team will have 13 athletes.

Men's tournament

Team roster

Group play

Quarterfinals

Semifinals 5–8

Fifth place game

Women's tournament

Team roster

Group play

Quarterfinals

Semifinals

Bronze medal game

Weightlifting

Hungary has qualified the following quota places.

Wrestling

Hungary has qualified the following quota place.

Men's freestyle

Men's Greco-Roman

Women's freestyle

References

Nations at the 2012 Summer Olympics
2012
Summer Olympics